Robert Newburgh Hickson (2 May 1884 – 21 June 1963) was an Australian architect and cricketer. He played fourteen first-class matches for New South Wales between 1902/03 and 1907/08. He was regional architect for the Rural Bank of New South Wales and for the Anglican Diocese of Armidale.

See also
 List of New South Wales representative cricketers

References

External links
 

1884 births
1963 deaths
Australian cricketers
New South Wales cricketers
Cricketers from Newcastle, New South Wales
New South Wales architects